"Home on Monday" is a song by Australian band Little River Band, released in September 1977 as the third single from the group's third studio album, Diamantina Cocktail. The song peaked at number 73 on the Australian Kent Music Report singles chart and in the Netherlands at number 12 in the "Nationale Hitparade" and at number 13 in the Dutch Top 40.

The "Las Vegas Hilton" in the song is now called the Westgate_Las_Vegas.

Track listing
Australian 7" (EMI 11522)
Side A. "Home on Monday" - 3:40
Side B. "Raelene, Raelene" - 4:27

Dutch 7" (EMI 5C 006-82401)
Side A. "Home On Monday - 3:47
Side B. "The Inner Light" - 3:25

Charts

References 

1977 singles
1976 songs
Little River Band songs
Songs written by Glenn Shorrock
EMI Records singles